Nikolay Davydenko was the defending champion but lost in the first round to Radek Štěpánek.

Juan Ignacio Chela won in the final 6–7(2–7), 6–3, 6–3 against Marat Safin.

Seeds

  Rainer Schüttler (first round)
  Nicolás Massú (first round)
  Agustín Calleri (first round)
  Tommy Robredo (quarterfinals)
  Juan Ignacio Chela (champion)
  Max Mirnyi (second round)
  Gastón Gaudio (first round)
  Marat Safin (final)

Draw

Finals

Top half

Bottom half

References
 2004 Estoril Open draw

2004 Men's Singles
Singles
Estoril Open